A software company is an organisation — owned either by state or private — established for profit whose primary products are various forms of software, software technology, distribution, and software product development. They make up the software industry.

Types 
There are a number of different types of software companies:
There are companies selling available to use commercial off-the-shelf (COTS) products, such as Microsoft's Outlook, Word and Excel, Adobe Systems's Acrobat, Illustrator and other designing tools, or Google apps like Chrome.
Many companies provide Software Development services, and have a structure to develop custom software for other companies and businesses.
Companies producing specialized commercial off-the-shelf software, such as Panorama, Hyperion, and Siebel Systems
Companies providing Software as a Service (SaaS), such as Google's email service Gmail, Voice and Maps, and companies like Salesforce and Zendesk.
Technology that mobilizes social media such as Facebook, LinkedIn, Instagram, Twitter and Parler.

There are also other types of SaaS products, of companies providing IT infrastructure services and Cloud Computing services, such as Amazon Web Services (AWS), Microsoft Azure Cloud Services, and GoDaddy hosting services.
API as a Service, that allows third party developers to interact with a companies software, such as Google Geo Location API, Google Calendar API, etc.

Companies producing software components, such as Syncfusion, DevExpress, Telerik UI, Kendo UI and Dundas
Application Service Provider such as Salesforce
Companies producing bespoke software for vertical industries or particular geographical regions
Independent software vendors (ISVs) that build, develop and sell consumer or enterprise software that is consumed by end users

All of these may be categorized in one or many of the following:
 contractual - when the software company is contracted to deliver some particular software from outside (software outsourcing)
 product development - when it produces ready to use, packaged software; Commercial off-the-shelf

Common roles in a software company 

Organizing a software company is a very specialized type of management skill, where experienced persons can turn the organizational problem into a unique benefit. For example, having sub-teams spread in different time zones may allow a 24-hour company working day,  if the teams, systems, and procedures are well established. A good example is the test team in a time zone 8 hours ahead or behind the development team, who fix software bugs found by the testers.

A professional software company normally consists of at least three dedicated sub-teams :
Business analysts who define the business needs of the market
Software developers who create the technical specification and write the software
Software testers who are responsible for the whole process of quality management

In bigger software companies, greater specialization is employed, and quite often there are also:

Technical writers who write all the documentation such as user guides
Release specialists who are responsible for building the whole product and software versioning
User experience designers, who are creating the design architecture based on business requirements, user research and expertise in usability
Graphic designers who are normally responsible for the design of the graphical user interface.
Maintenance engineers who are behind two, three or more lines of support
Consultants are responsible for making the solution operational, especially if some specialist knowledge is necessary. Examples of this include: building multidimensional cubes in business intelligence software, integrating with existing solutions, and implementing business scenarios in Business Process Management software.

Structure 

The manager of a software company is usually called the Head Of Development (HOD), and reports to the stakeholders. He or she leads the sub-teams directly or via the managers/leaders depending on the size of the organization. Usually teams of up to 10 person are the most operational. In bigger organizations, there are in general two models of the hierarchy:

All the teams are fully independent and they work separately on the different projects. The structure is quite simple and all the employees reports to one person, what make the situation quite clear however it is not a good solution in terms of knowledge exchange and optimal usage of human resources.

In this model there are dedicated managers/leaders for each main specialization, "renting" their people for particular projects led by product/project managers, who formally or informally buy the people and pay for their time. This leads to each private employee having two bosses – the product/project manager and the specialized "resource" manager. On one hand it optimizes the usage of human resources, on the other hand it may give rise to conflicts about which one manager has priority in the structure.

There are also a number of variants of these structures, and a number of organizations have this structure spread and split within various departments and units.

Methodologies

Software companies may use a number of various methodologies to produce the code. These can include:
the waterfall model, including project management methodologies like PRINCE2 or PMBoK
agile software development, such as Extreme Programming and SCRUM

There are also some methodologies which combine both, such as the spiral model, Rational Unified Process (RUP) or MSF.

Product life cycle
Regardless of the methodology used, the product life cycle always consists of at least three stages:
 Design – including both the business and technical specification
 Coding – the development itself
 Testing – the quality management

Each stage ideally takes 30% of the total time, with the remaining 10% in reserve.

The UML sequence diagram of interaction between these groups may look like:

At each stage a different group plays a key role, however each type of role must be involved throughout the whole development process:
 Analysts, after completing the business specification, manage the changing business situation to minimize the possibility of change over time. They also support both programmers and testers during the whole development process to ensure that the final product fulfills the business needs specified at the start. The process ideally puts business analysts as the key players during final delivery of the solution to the customer, as they are best placed to provide the best business layer.
 Programmers do the technical specification during the design phase, which is why they are called programmers/designers, and during testing time they fix bugs.
 Testers complete the test scenarios during the design phase, and evaluate them during the coding phase

Systems and procedures 
software companies possess various systems and procedures implemented and working internally across all the sub-teams. These include:

Business analysts
Modeling tools like Sparx Systems Enterprise Architect or IBM Rational Rose

Programmers
Version Control Systems and software versioning procedures
Code analysis tools and coding standards, validated manually or automatically
Deployment mechanisms

Testers
Bug tracking systems
Test automation tools
Performance and stress test tools

Project/product managers
Enterprise Project Management (EPM) systems and procedures
Product portfolio management (PPM)
Change management systems and procedures

There are also Application Lifecycle Management (ALM), which embed some of these functionalities in one package and are used across the groups. They are delivered from various vendors like Borland, ECM or Compuware.

Efficiency audits 
Well-established software companies typically have some way of measuring their own efficiency. This is usually done by defining the set of key performance indicators (KPI), such as
The average number of bugs done by the developer per unit of time or source lines of code
The number of bugs found by tester per test cycle
The average number of test cycles until Zero Bug Bounce (ZBB)
The average time of test cycle
Estimated time of task comparing to the real time of the task (exactitude of planning)
Number of corrections to the baseline

A number of organizations are focused on reaching the optimum level of the Capability Maturity Model (CMM),  where "optimum" does not necessarily mean the highest. There are also other systems such as Carnegie-Mellon University's SEMA, or particular ISO standards. Small software companies will sometimes use less formalized approaches. Each organization works out its own style, which lies somewhere between total technocracy (where all is defined by numbers) and total anarchy (where there are no numbers at all). Whichever way the organization goes, they consider the pyramid describing the cost and risk of introducing change to already-begun development processes:

See also

 List of the largest software companies

References

Software development
 
Knowledge firms